Washington Park Mall is a 432,303 square foot shopping mall in Bartlesville, Oklahoma. It is the only mall located within  of Bartlesville. It is owned and managed by Kohan Retail Investment Group. The mall opened in 1984. Many of the stores are now closed for various reasons.

Anchors
Dillard's 74,086 ft³
Dunham's Sports

Former Anchors
JCPenney (closed May 12, 2018)
Sears (closed January 2019)
Goody's (closed 2020)

References

External links
Official site

Shopping malls in Oklahoma
Shopping malls established in 1984
Bartlesville, Oklahoma
1984 establishments in Oklahoma
Kohan Retail Investment Group